Barbara Jordan (born April 2, 1957) is an American former professional tennis player who won the 1979 Australian Open singles title.  

Jordan also won the mixed doubles title at the 1983 French Open with Eliot Teltscher.  Jordan was a three-time All-American at Stanford University, where she obtained her degree in economics in three years. She won the 1978 AIAW College National doubles with sister Kathy Jordan in 1978. Jordan made her first appearance on the (WTA) computer in August 1977 at No. 95. She was a five-time member of WTA board of directors as well as served as chairman of the tournament committee in 1980. Jordan also won the USTA under 21-National Championship in 1978 in singles and doubles. She went on to earn her Juris Doctor from UCLA.

Grand Slam tournament finals

Singles (1 title)

Mixed doubles (1 title)

Grand Slam tournament performance timeline

Singles

Note: The Australian Open was held twice in 1977, in January and December.

Honors
Jordan has been inducted in the ITA Women's Hall of Fame, the USTA Hall of Fame, the Stanford Hall of Fame and others

References

External links
  (which as of 10/21/2014 shows no participation in the 1979 Australian Open and an incorrect career high ranking)
 

1957 births
Living people
American female tennis players
Australian Open (tennis) champions
Sportspeople from Milwaukee
Stanford Cardinal women's tennis players
Tennis people from Wisconsin
Grand Slam (tennis) champions in women's singles
Grand Slam (tennis) champions in mixed doubles